Alexei Petrovich Popogrebski (born 7 August 1972) is a Russian film director and screenwriter. His 2010 film How I Ended This Summer was nominated for the Golden Bear at the 60th Berlin International Film Festival, and won Best Film at the 2010 London Film Festival Awards.

Filmography
 Roads to Koktebel (2003)
 Simple Things (2007)
 How I Ended This Summer (2010)

Television
 The Optimists (2017; original title: Оптимисты)

References

External links

1972 births
Living people
Russian film directors
Russian screenwriters
Male screenwriters
Russian male writers
Writers from Moscow